Patricio Gabriel Araujo Vázquez  (born 30 January 1988 in Colima, Mexico) is a Mexican former professional footballer who played as a centre-back.

Club career
Araujo made his league debut for Chivas on 30 October 2005 against Morelia. He played in all 24 of Chivas's games as they won the Apertura 2006 tournament. His first league goal came on 13 October 2007 versus Necaxa. As of the end of the Apertura 2010 season Araujo had made over 130 league appearances for Chivas Guadalajara.

International career
Patricio Araujo has played with the Mexico national football team in three categories. He played with the Mexico U-17, including six appearances during the 2005 FIFA U-17 World Championship in Peru, a tournament that Mexico won.

Honours
Guadalajara
Mexican Championship: Apertura 2006

Mexico U17
FIFA U-17 World Championship: 2005

References

External links
 
 
 

Living people
Mexico under-20 international footballers
Footballers from Colima
Association football midfielders
C.D. Guadalajara footballers
Club Puebla players
Liga MX players
Ascenso MX players
Mexico international footballers
People from Colima City
1988 births
Mexican footballers